The Solomon Islands national football team is the national football team of the Solomon Islands, administered by the Solomon Islands Football Federation. The Solomon Islands national football team was founded in 1978. They were officially recognised by FIFA a decade later, in 1988.

History
During the 2004 Oceania World Cup qualification/Oceania Cup the team drew 2–2 with Australia and qualified for the second leg. In the second leg, the Solomon Islands national men's team were thrashed by Australia 5–1 and 6–0 in the two matches, with Australia qualifying for the 2005 Confederations Cup.

The Solomons got a second chance against the Socceroos in a two-legged series in September 2005, this time with the winner advancing to a two-legged series against CONMEBOL's fifth-place finisher for a berth in the 2006 FIFA World Cup, and the team was thrashed by Australia 7–0 on the first leg and 2–1 in the second played at home.

The Solomons were knocked out of the 2010 FIFA World Cup – having got off to a good start winning every game in their qualifying group and comfortably progressing to the knockout rounds, defeats to New Caledonia and then to Vanuatu saw them knocked out of the competition.

In 2012, the Solomon Islands held the 2012 OFC Nations Cup which was also the second round of World Cup qualifying for the 2014 FIFA World Cup where they finished in fourth place after qualifying through to the knockout stage by defeating Papua New Guinea and having draws against Fiji and New Zealand. They lost in the semi-final after they lost to the champions Tahiti after Jonathan Tehau scored the only goal. They later lost to New Zealand in the third-place playoff. The third round of World Cup qualifying saw the team finish bottom of the group after only taking one win against Tahiti.

After first taking charge of the team in 2017, Spaniard Felipe Vega-Arango was appointed for his second stint in June 2021.

In 2019, they went on a three-week tour of the Netherlands.

Kit sponsorship

Sponsors 

  Lotto
  Telekom

Results and fixtures

In March 2022, the Solomon Islands will play their first matches since they took part in the 2019 Pacific Games.

2022

2023

Coaching staff

Coaching history
Caretaker managers are listed in italics.

   Edward Ngara (1995–1996)
  Wilson Maelaua (1996)
  George Cowie (2000–2003)
  Alan Gillett (2004–2005)
  Airton Andrioli (2006–2009)
  Jacob Moli (2010–2014)
  Moses Toata (2015–2016)
  Felipe Vega-Arango (2017–2018)
  Moses Toata (2018–2019)
  Wim Rijsbergen (2019)
  Stanley Waita (2020–2021)
  Felipe Vega-Arango (2021–present)

Players

Current squad
The following players were called up for the FIFA World Cup qualification matches in March 2022.

Caps and goals updated as of 30 March 2022, after the match against New Zealand.

Player records

Players in bold are still active with Solomon Islands.

Most capped players

Top goalscorers

Competitive record

FIFA World Cup

OFC Nations Cup

Pacific Games

Wantok Cup
 2008 (July, 1st edition) – First place

Head-to-head record

Honours 

 OFC Nations Cup
 Runners-up (1): 2004
 Third place (2): 1996, 2000
 South Pacific Games
 Runners-up (3): 1991, 1995, 2011
 Third place (1): 1975, 1979
 Wantok Cup
 Winners (1): 2008

References

External links
 Solomon Islands Football Federation official website

 
Oceanian national association football teams